This is a list of countries by oil production (i.e., petroleum production), as compiled from the U.S. Energy Information Administration database for calendar year 2021, tabulating all countries on a comparable best-estimate basis. Compared with shorter-term data, the full-year figures are less prone to distortion from periodic maintenance shutdowns and other seasonal cycles. The volumes in the table represent crude oil and lease condensate, the hydrocarbon liquids collected at or near the wellhead. The volumes in the table do not include biofuel. They also do not include the increase in liquid volumes during oil refining ("refinery gain"), or liquids separated from natural gas in gas processing plants (natural gas liquids).

Under this definition, total world oil production in 2021 averaged 77,043,680 barrels per day. Approximately 71% came from the top ten countries, and an overlapping 37% came from the thirteen current OPEC members, in the table below.

In recent history, the top three producers have been the United States, Russia, and Saudi Arabia. Each of these countries experienced major production declines at different times in the past, but since 2014 all three have been producing near their peak rates of 9 to 11 million barrels per day. Saudi Arabia and Russia also top the list of oil exporting countries. The monthly U.S. oil production reached 12.86 million b/d in November 2019, the highest monthly level of crude oil production in U.S. history. In May 2019 the country became a net oil and gas exporter for the first time since 1953.

See also 
 List of countries by natural gas production
 List of countries by natural gas proven reserves
 List of countries by natural gas consumption
 List of countries by oil consumption
 List of countries by proven oil reserves
 Natural gas by country
 World energy supply and consumption

References 

Oil production
Production
Petroleum economics
Oil production